The 1984 Summer Olympics, officially known as the Games of the XXIII Olympiad, were a summer multi-sport event held in Los Angeles, California, United States, from July 28 to August 12. A total of 6,829 athletes from 140 nations participated in 221 events in 21 sports.

Overall, 47 nations received at least one medal, and 25 of them won at least one gold medal. Athletes from host nation United States won the most medals overall, with 174, and the most gold medals, with 83. The former record was the largest overall medal haul for the nation since the 1904 edition; the latter record was the highest gold medal tally at a single Games and the most for a host nation. It marked the first time the United States led the medal count in both gold and overall medals since 1968. Sports commentators noted that the absence of the Soviet Union and various other Eastern Bloc nations stemming from a boycott contributed to the highly skewed medal results benefitting the United States and other countries. Romania won the second most gold medals (20) and the third most total medals (53), marking its highest medal tally in history. West Germany won the third most gold medals, with 17, and the second most total medals, with 59.

Runner Carl Lewis and gymnast Ecaterina Szabo won the most gold medals at the games with four each. Gymnast Li Ning won the greatest number of medals overall, winning six in total. Morocco and Portugal won their first Olympic gold medals. Algeria, Dominican Republic, Ivory Coast, Syria, and Zambia won their nation's first Olympic medals.

Medal table

The medal table is based on information provided by the International Olympic Committee (IOC) and is consistent with IOC convention in its published medal tables. By default, the table is ordered by the number of gold medals the athletes from a nation have won, where each nation is an entity represented by a National Olympic Committee (NOC). The number of silver medals is taken into consideration next and then the number of bronze medals.

In the boxing and judo events, two bronze medals are awarded in each weight class. Two gold medals (and no silver medals) were awarded for first place ties in the women's uneven bars, women's balance beam, and men's rings gymnastics events. Four silver medals (and no bronze) were awarded in the men's vault gymnastics competition. Two bronze medals were awarded for third-place ties in both the women's 100 metre hurdles and the men's pole vault competitions.

Key
 Changes in medal standings (see below)

Changes in medal standings

See also 

 All-time Olympic Games medal table
 1984 Summer Paralympics medal table

Notes

References

External links
 

Medal count
1984